¡Torero! (Bullfighter! or Torero!) is a 1956 Mexican documentary film directed by Carlos Velo about Mexican bullfighter Luis Procuna. It was nominated for an Academy Award for Best Documentary Feature. The film was also selected as the Mexican entry for the Best Foreign Language Film at the 30th Academy Awards, but was not accepted as a nominee.

Cast
 Luis Procuna as himself
 Consuelo Procuna as herself
 Ángel Procuna
 Antonio Sevilia
 José Farjat
 Arturo Fregoso
 Ponciano Díaz
 Paco Malgesto
 Manolete as himself
 Carlos Arruza as himself
 Luis Briones as himself
 Manuel Dos Santos as himself
 Luís Castro as himself (as El Soldado)
 Lorenzo Garza as himself
 José Laurentino López Rodriguez as Novillero Joselillo
 Dolores del Río as Guest
 Miroslava as herself

See also
 List of submissions to the 30th Academy Awards for Best Foreign Language Film
 List of Mexican submissions for the Academy Award for Best Foreign Language Film

References

External links

1956 films
1956 documentary films
1950s Spanish-language films
Mexican documentary films
Black-and-white documentary films
Films directed by Carlos Velo
Bullfighting films
1950s Mexican films
Mexican black-and-white films